Richard Kirk Dunwell (born 17 June 1971 in Islington, England), is an English footballer who played as a forward. He played in the Football League for Millwall, Aldershot, Barnet.

References

External links

1980 births
Living people
English footballers
People from Islington (district)
Millwall F.C. players
Aldershot F.C. players
Collier Row F.C. players
Barnet F.C. players
Cheltenham Town F.C. players
Dagenham & Redbridge F.C. players
Enfield F.C. players
Ebbsfleet United F.C. players
Walton & Hersham F.C. players
Billericay Town F.C. players
Hemel Hempstead Town F.C. players
English Football League players
Association football forwards